Lewiston Lake is a reservoir impounded by Lewiston Dam on the Trinity River, in Trinity County, California.

Geography
Lewiston Lake is near the towns of Weaverville and Lewiston in Trinity County, California.

It is used for transbasin diversion to the Sacramento River and flood control, as well as for hydroelectric generation. It is in the canyon between the Trinity Mountains and Marble Mountains of the southern Klamath Mountains System.

Recreation
Lewiston reservoir is within the Trinity Unit of the Whiskeytown-Shasta-Trinity National Recreation Area, in the Shasta-Trinity National Forest. It is a popular destination for fishing, kayaking, and camping.

The California Office of Environmental Health Hazard Assessment (OEHHA) has developed a safe eating advisory for Lewiston Lake based on levels of mercury or PCBs found in fish caught from this water body.

See also
 List of dams and reservoirs in California

References

 
 

Reservoirs in Trinity County, California
Trinity River (California)
Shasta-Trinity National Forest
Klamath Mountains
Trinity Mountains (California)
Tourist attractions in Trinity County, California
Reservoirs in Northern California